Leptodeuterocopus angulatus is a moth of the family Pterophoridae that is known from Brazil.

Adults are on wing in September, October and December.

External links

Deuterocopinae
Moths described in 2006
Endemic fauna of Brazil
Moths of South America